Revolutionary Students Unity (RSU) or Biplobi Chhatro Moitry, is an independent secular students rights organization in Bangladesh. Not to be confused with the Students Unity of Bangladesh or Bangladesh Chhatro Moitry, an independent student organization.  The organisation was founded in 1980 through the unification of four student movements: Jatio Chhatra Andolan, Purbo Bangla Chhatra Union, Jatio Chhatra Dal and Jatio Chhatra Dal. It originally followed the pro-Peking students union stream, but its political theory has changed over the years. It had a significant role during most of the recent progressive movements, notably the anti-Ershad people's movement and anti-Razakar movement under Jahanara Imam. 

The central committee of RSU consists of 27 members.
The present convener is Faisal Faruk Ovik.

References 

Student organisations in Bangladesh
Bangladeshi student movements
Student organizations established in 1980